Roland Blaesi (29 January 1932 – 10 April 2017) was a Swiss alpine skier. He competed in the men's giant slalom at the 1956 Winter Olympics.

References

External links
 

1932 births
2017 deaths
Swiss male alpine skiers
Olympic alpine skiers of Switzerland
Alpine skiers at the 1956 Winter Olympics
Sportspeople from Graubünden